The list below details Martina Navratilova's Open Era record 74-match winning streak in 1984 on the Women's Tennis Association (WTA) tour (Women's Singles).   

Period: January 20 to December 6, 1984

 BYE - Automatic advancement of a player to the next round of a tournament without facing an opponent.

References

Martina Navratilova
1984 in tennis
History of tennis